Håvard Lie (born 21 May 1975) is a Norwegian former ski jumper.

In the World Cup he only finished 3 times among the top 10 in his long career.

At the 1997 FIS Nordic World Ski Championships he merely finished 28th in the normal hill and only 9th in the large hill.

External links

1975 births
Living people
Norwegian male ski jumpers